Árchez is a small village in the province of Málaga, in southern Spain. The village is situated approximately 21 kilometres from Vélez Málaga. It has a population of approximately 408 residents, who are known as Archeros.

Archez is located on the foothills of the Sierra Almijara on the scenic Mudejar Route.

Archez is located in a valley, and the River Turvilla runs through the village.  Following the course of the river, a trail takes walkers up into the hills and into the neighbouring village of Canillas D'Albaida. Along the course of the river, are the remains of three old flour mills, an indication of Archez's previous status as an important farming village. Today, most of the village slopes are filled with vines, avocado and olive trees, and the local farmers can be seen with their mules collecting their harvests.

The peaceful village "comes alive" for one weekend in August when its annual Fiesta takes place. Fireworks, music and a horse race transform this sleepy village into a 24hr party venue.

Adjoined to the parish church of Nuestra Señora de la Encarnacíon is a 16th-century Mudéjar tower whose minaret dates from the 13th century.

References

Municipalities in the Province of Málaga